Telephone numbers in Georgia consist of 9 digits and follow a closed numbering plan in which the initial 2 or 3 digits indicate the service or area code (in case of geographic numbers) and the remaining 6 or 7 digits identify the subscriber.

Numbering plan
The current dialling plan is in force since 4 June 2011 when a wide-ranging reform took place. Specifically, area codes were updated to start with 2 or 3, mobile numbers came to begin with the digit 5, and some geographical numbers were padded with an additional digit 2 or 3 immediately after the area code to the total number of digits equalling 9. The current plan is as follows:

Geographic numbering 
Since 1 March 2011, area codes have changed and the first digit came to indicate the respective part of the country: numbers start with  3  for eastern Georgia and with  4  for western Georgia. The current area codes are as follows:

Mobile telephony numbering

Georgian mobile operators receive their number allocations in blocks of 1 million numbers, hence the first three digits usually indicate the original mobile network providing the number. However, since mobile number portability was introduced in Georgia on 15 February 2011, the links are no longer certain. 

Telephone prefixes originally distributed to mobile operators are listed below.

On 20 June 2011, the digit 5 was added to the prefixes for mobile operators. For example, prefix 77 was changed to 577.

In addition, the mobile operator Aquafon operating in Abkhazia and using the Russian (+7) 9409 code can also be reached using the Georgian code (+995) 544.

Fixed wireless numbering

On 27 June 2011, prefixes for fixed wireless telephony changed: digit 7 have been added to the prefix. For example, prefix 90 have been changed to 790.

Dialling

Calling within Georgia
Calling geographical numbers:
  0 - Destination area code [2 or 3 digits] - Subscriber's phone number [6 or 7 digits]
Calling mobile numbers:
  0 - Subscriber's number [9 digits]

For example, to dial landline phone in Tbilisi:

  xxx xxxx              (within Tbilisi) 
  0 - 32 - xxx xxxx     (within Georgia) 
  +995 - 32 - xxx xxxx  (from abroad)

To dial mobile number, for example the one of Magticom:

  595 - xxx xxx         (from mobile network) 
  0 - 595 - xxx xxx     (within Georgia, from landlines) 
  +995 - 595 - xxx xxx  (from abroad)

Calling abroad 
The dial plan is as follows:
  Optional carrier code – 00 - Destination country code - Subscriber number

The following carrier codes are in use for international communication:

For example, to call Geneva (Switzerland) using default international code and pre-selected operator code of Silknet:

  00 - 41 - 22 - xxx xx xx
  1016 - 00 - 41 - 22 - xxx xx xx

Emergency and short numbers

References

Georgia
Georgia (country) communications-related lists